Zapoteca aculeata is a species of flowering plant in the family Fabaceae, that is endemic to Tungurahua, Ecuador. Its natural habitat is subtropical or tropical moist montane forests.

References

aculeata
Flora of Ecuador
Endangered plants
Taxonomy articles created by Polbot